Nothomyia calopus is a species of soldier fly in the family Stratiomyidae.

Distribution
United States, Cuba, Puerto Rico.

References

Stratiomyidae
Insects described in 1869
Diptera of North America
Taxa named by Hermann Loew